The Dwyer Escarpment is an ice-covered escarpment that overlooks the north coast of Victoria Land between Cooper Spur and Cape North, Antarctica. The escarpment lies situated on the Pennell Coast, a portion of Antarctica lying between Cape Williams and Cape Adare.

This feature was first mapped by Australian National Antarctic Research Expeditions (ANARE) in 1962, which gave the name after L.J. Dwyer, a former Director of the Australian Commonwealth Bureau of Meteorology, and a member of the ANARE Executive Planning Committee.

References 

Escarpments of Antarctica
Landforms of Victoria Land
Pennell Coast